Thomas Gibb (1838–1894) was an English Liberal politician.

Thomas Gibb or Gybbe may also refer to:
Thomas Augustus Gibb, co-founder of Gibb, Livingston & Co., a foreign trading firm in China
Tommy Gibb (born 1944), footballer
Thomas Gybbe, MP for Liskeard (UK Parliament constituency)

See also

Gibb (surname)

Thomas Gibbs (disambiguation)
Thomas (disambiguation)
Gibb (disambiguation)